In probability and statistics, given two stochastic processes  and , the cross-covariance is a function that gives the covariance of one process with the other at pairs of time points.

Cross-covariance is related to the more commonly used cross-correlation of the processes in question.

In signal processing, the cross-covariance is often called cross-correlation and is a measure of similarity of two signals, commonly used to find features in an unknown signal by comparing it to a known one. It is a function of the relative time between the signals, is sometimes called the sliding dot product, and has applications in pattern recognition and cryptanalysis.

Cross-covariance of random vectors

Cross-covariance of stochastic processes
The definition of cross-covariance of random vectors may be generalized to stochastic processes as follows:

Definition
Let  and  denote stochastic processes. Then the cross-covariance function of the processes  is defined by:

If the processes are complex-valued stochastic processes, the second factor needs to be complex conjugated:

Definition for jointly WSS processes

 for all ,

 for all 

and

 for all 

By setting  (the time lag, or the amount of time by which the signal has been shifted), we may define

.

The cross-covariance function of two jointly WSS processes is therefore given by:

which is equivalent to

.

Uncorrelatedness
Formally:

.

Cross-covariance of deterministic signals
The cross-covariance is also relevant in signal processing where the cross-covariance between two wide-sense stationary random processes can be estimated by averaging the product of samples measured from one process and samples measured from the other (and its time shifts). The samples included in the average can be an arbitrary subset of all the samples in the signal (e.g., samples within a finite time window or a sub-sampling of one of the signals). For a large number of samples, the average converges to the true covariance.

Cross-covariance may also refer to a "deterministic" cross-covariance between two signals.  This consists of summing over all time indices. For example, for discrete-time signals  and  the cross-covariance is defined as

where the line indicates that the complex conjugate is taken when the signals are complex-valued.

For continuous functions  and  the (deterministic) cross-covariance is defined as

.

Properties 

The (deterministic) cross-covariance of two continuous signals is related to the convolution by

and the (deterministic) cross-covariance of two discrete-time signals is related to the discrete convolution by

.

See also
 Autocovariance
 Autocorrelation
 Correlation
 Convolution
 Cross-correlation

References

External links
 Cross Correlation from Mathworld
 http://scribblethink.org/Work/nvisionInterface/nip.html
 http://www.phys.ufl.edu/LIGO/stochastic/sign05.pdf
 http://www.staff.ncl.ac.uk/oliver.hinton/eee305/Chapter6.pdf

Covariance and correlation
Time domain analysis
Signal processing